Shasan is a 2016 Marathi-language political drama film directed by Gajendra Ahire and produced by Shekhar Pathak under the banner of Shreya Films. The film stars  Makarand Anaspure, Bharat Jadhav, Jitendra Joshi, Manava Naik, Siddhartha Jadhav, Shriram Lagoo, Vikram Gokhale, Mohan Joshi, Vinay Apte and Nagesh Bhosle. Film was scheduled to be theatrically released on 15 January 2016.

Cast
 Makarand Anaspure as Vishwas 
 Bharat Jadhav as Jairaj Patil 
 Jitendra Joshi Subhash Naigaonkar 
 Manava Naik as Indrani 
 Siddhartha Jadhav as Mahadev 
 Shriram Lagoo as Vishwasrao Tidke
 Vrinda Gajendra as Vidya
 Vikram Gokhale 
 Mohan Joshi 
 Millind Shinde
 Vinay Apte as Anandrao
 Nagesh Bhosle 
 Sudhir Dalvi 
 Aditi Bhagwat as Sangeeta
 Amit Dattatray 
 Jayant Sawarkar as Satyakam Master

Critical response 
Ganesh Matkari of Pune Mirror wrote "The film overflows with major actors, and most are entirely wasted. The cameo of Dr Lagoo as a politician of yesteryear, now redundant and ignored by the present crop, is the most disturbing as it seems to mock his status as one of our biggest and brightest actors". Jaydeep Pathak of  Maharashtra Times wrote "Shasan movie portrays an individual mindset. It will make you want to watch the movie again and again".

References

External links
 

2016 films
Films directed by Gajendra Ahire
2010s Marathi-language films